Joseph Jackson (April 1, 1831 – October 31, 1908) was a Canadian parliamentarian and lumberman.

Jackson was born in Norfolk County in what was then Upper Canada and became a lumberman in Simcoe. He was elected to the House of Commons of Canada in the 1882 federal election representing Norfolk South as a Liberal MP after defeating incumbent William Wallace by 26 votes. He was defeated after a single term in the 1887 federal election losing to Conservative David Tisdale by 51 votes.

In 1892, he was appointed sheriff of Norfolk.

He was married twice: first to Melinda Dowling and then to Mrs. Robert Jackson. He died in Simcoe at the age of 77.

References 

1831 births
1908 deaths
Members of the House of Commons of Canada from Ontario
Liberal Party of Canada MPs